is a 2022 action role-playing game developed by FromSoftware and published by Bandai Namco Entertainment. Directed by Hidetaka Miyazaki with worldbuilding provided by fantasy writer George R. R. Martin, it was released for PlayStation 4, PlayStation 5, Windows, Xbox One, and Xbox Series X/S on February 25. In the game, players control a customizable player character on a journey to repair the titular Elden Ring and become the new Elden Lord.

Elden Ring is presented through a third-person perspective, with players freely roaming its interactive open world. The six main areas are traversed using the player character's steed Torrent as the primary mode of transportation, while linear hidden dungeons can be explored to find useful items. Combat is facilitated by several types of weapons and magic spells, including non-direct engagement enabled by stealth mechanics. Checkpoints located throughout the world allow for the player to improve their attributes using an in-game currency called Runes, as well as acting as locations that enable fast travel. Elden Ring features online multiplayer, with players able to join each other for both cooperative and player versus player combat.

FromSoftware wanted to create an open-world game with gameplay similar to Dark Souls, intending Elden Ring to act as an evolution of the self-titled debut of the series. Miyazaki admired Martin's work and hoped his contributions would produce a more accessible narrative than FromSoftware's previous games. Martin was given the freedom to design the backstory without restriction, while Miyazaki remained lead writer for the story taking place during gameplay. The developers concentrated on environmental scale, roleplaying, and the story as the main elements, with the scale requiring the construction of several separate structures inside the open world.

Elden Ring received critical acclaim, with praise directed towards its open-world, gameplay systems, and setting, although some criticism went towards its technical performance. It won multiple Game of the Year awards and sold over 20 million copies in a year. An expansion, Shadow of the Erdtree, was announced in February 2023.

Gameplay

Elden Ring is an action role-playing game played in a third person perspective, with gameplay focusing on combat and exploration. It features elements similar to those found in other games developed by FromSoftware, such as the Dark Souls series, Bloodborne, and Sekiro: Shadows Die Twice. Set in an open world, players are allowed to freely explore the Lands Between and its six main areas; these locations range from Limgrave, an area featuring grassy plains and ancient ruins, to Caelid, a wasteland home to undead monsters. Open world areas are explorable using the character's mount, Torrent, as the primary mode of transportation, along with the ability to fast travel outside of combat. Throughout the game, players encounter non-player characters (NPCs) and enemies, including the demigods who rule each main area and serve as the game's main bosses. Aside from open world areas, Elden Ring also features hidden dungeons, such as catacombs, tunnels, and caves where players can fight bosses and gather helpful items.

The player chooses a character class at the start of the game, which determines their starting spells, equipment, and attributes. Combat with enemies can be within melee range, or from a distance using ranged weapons or spells. Attacks from enemies can be blocked using shields or avoided by dodging. Spells in Elden Ring allow the player to enhance their own weapons, fight enemies from afar, and restore lost hit points. The player can memorize a limited amount of these spells, which can be cast using a staff or Sacred Seal item. Weapons in Elden Ring can be improved using Ashes of War, obtainable "enchantments" that grant weapons new capabilities. Ashes of War can be applied to or removed from weapons, and each Ash adds a Weapon Art, a special ability that can be used during combat. Aside from direct combat, stealth mechanics can be used to avoid enemies entirely, or allow for the targeting of foes with critical hits while hidden.

Checkpoints called Sites of Grace are located throughout the game's areas; they are places where the character can increase the power of their attributes, change memorized spells, swap Ashes of War, or walk to using fast travel. Upon death, players respawn at the last Site of Grace they interacted with. Alternatively, they may choose to respawn at certain locations highlighted by "Stakes of Marika" provided they died nearby. To increase their attributes at Sites of Grace, the player must spend runes, an in-game currency acquired by defeating enemies. Runes can also be used to buy items and improve weapons and armor. Dying in Elden Ring will cause the player to lose all collected runes at the location of death, and if the player dies again before retrieving the runes, they will be lost forever.

The game contains crafting mechanics, which require materials in order to create items. To craft a certain item, the player must have the item's crafting recipe. Recipes can be found inside collectibles called Cookbooks, which are scattered throughout the world. Materials can be collected by defeating enemies, exploring the game's world, or by trading with merchant NPCs. Crafted items range from poison darts and exploding pots, to consumables that temporarily increase the player's strength in combat. Similar to the Dark Souls games, the player can summon friendly NPCs called spirits to fight enemies. Each type of summonable spirit requires its equivalent Spirit Ash for summoning; different types of Spirit Ashes can be discovered as the player explores the game world. Spirits can only be summoned near structures called Rebirth Monuments, which are primarily found in large areas and inside boss fight arenas.

Elden Ring has a multiplayer system that allows players to be summoned for both cooperative and player versus player (PvP) play over the Internet. Cooperative play involves the placing of a Summon Sign on the ground, which causes the sign to appear in the world of online players who have used a corresponding item. If another player interacts with the sign, whoever placed down the sign is summoned into their world. Cooperative players remain in the same world until the boss of the area is defeated, or until a summoned player dies and is sent back to their home world. PvP combat involves using a Summon Sign to directly challenge another player to a duel, or using additional items to invade the worlds of others. World hosts may also use a "Taunter's Tongue" to increase the likelihood that their world will be invaded by others, as well as decreasing the time between invasions.

Synopsis

Premise
Elden Ring takes place in the Lands Between, a fictional landmass ruled over by several demigods. It was previously ruled over by the immortal Queen Marika, who acted as keeper of the Elden Ring, a powerful force that manifested as the physical concept of order. When Marika eventually shattered the Elden Ring and disappeared, her demigod children began warring over pieces of the Ring in an event called the Shattering. Each demigod possesses a shard of the Ring called a Great Rune, which corrupts them with power. In the game, the player character is a Tarnished, one of a group of exiles from the Lands Between who are summoned back after the Shattering. As one of the Tarnished, the player must traverse the realm to repair the Elden Ring and become the Elden Lord.

Plot
Early on in their journey to repair the Elden Ring, the Tarnished encounters a maiden named Melina. As the Tarnished is maidenless, Melina offers to act as their maiden, granting them the ability to turn runes into strength, as well as giving the Tarnished their steed Torrent. She does this under the condition that the Tarnished brings her to the Erdtree, the home of the Elden Ring. Melina later takes the Tarnished to the Roundtable Hold, a gathering place for other Tarnished seeking to repair the Elden Ring. The Hold's benefactor, the Two Fingers, instructs the Tarnished to collect the Great Runes and bring them to the Erdtree, where they can be used to repair the Elden Ring.

The Tarnished proceeds to journey into the Lands Between, investigating its various locales and defeating the demigods. After recovering at least two Great Runes, the Two Fingers allows them to battle Morgott the Grace-Given, the demigod guarding the Erdtree. The Tarnished defeats Morgott but finds the Edtree's interior blocked by a wall of thorns. Melina then arrives and advises that they journey to find the Flame of Ruin, which they can use to set the Erdtree on fire and burn away the thorns. The Tarnished is then free to journey towards the Flame of Ruin, or can search for a way to harness the equally powerful Frenzied Flame.

Upon obtaining the Flame of Ruin, if the Tarnished did not gain the power of the Frenzied Flame, then Melina will take the Flame of Ruin and sacrifice herself to set the Erdtree on fire. If the Tarnished gained the power of the Frenzied Flame, then Melina will abandon the Tarnished, forcing them to use the Frenzied Flame to set the Erdtree on fire. Regardless, the Tarnished is transported to the ruined city of Farum Azula while the Erdtree burns. After defeating Maliketh the Black Blade and using his Rune of Death to fuel the fire, the Tarnished is returned to the foot of the scorched Erdtree. Inside, they fight Radagon, Queen Marika's consort cohabitating her body, as well as the guardian of the tree, the Elden Beast. After both are vanquished, the Tarnished gains access to Marika's shattered corpse, which contains the remains of the Elden Ring. Depending on the Tarnished's actions throughout the game, six different endings can then be achieved, ranging from the Tarnished becoming the Elden Lord, to allowing the Elden Ring to be destroyed by Ranni the Witch, or using the Frenzied Flame to destroy the Lands Between.

Development and release

FromSoftware had previously been known for developing the Dark Souls series, noted for their high level of difficulty. Director Hidetaka Miyazaki wanted to create an open world game, intending Elden Ring as a mechanical evolution to Dark Souls. The game was designed to have a more expansive environment compared to the narrow dungeons of FromSoftware's previous games, with Miyazaki hoping that the grander scale would add freedom and depth to exploration. FromSoftware approached American author George R. R. Martin, known for the A Song of Ice and Fire series of fantasy novels, to provide worldbuilding for Elden Ring. A fan of Martin's work, Miyazaki hoped Martin's contributions would produce a more accessible narrative than the studio's previous games.

Miyazaki remained lead writer for the main storyline in the game but gave Martin the creative freedom to write about events that had taken place before the main narrative. The process was compared by Miyazaki as using a "dungeon master's handbook in a tabletop RPG". As with many of FromSoftware's previous games, the story was designed to not be clearly explained. The developers intended for players to interpret the story for themselves via flavor text and optional discussions with non-player characters (NPCs). Miyazaki said that he enjoyed writing NPCs with more detail, believing they were more compelling than in his earlier works. In an interview with IGN, the director said that he chose to give Martin control over the pre-narrative because of the restrictions that FromSoftware's method of storytelling placed on writers. He noted that FromSoftware did not want a linear or story-focused game, and by giving Martin oversight of a history that the player was not directly involved in, he could allow Martin to freely design his contributions. Some staff from Game of Thrones, a television series adaptation of A Song of Ice and Fire, also assisted with the game's development.

Production of the game began in early 2017 following the release of The Ringed City, a piece of downloadable content for Dark Souls III. The game was developed alongside Sekiro: Shadows Die Twice, which Miyazaki also directed. He explained that although the combat in Elden Ring has similarities to Sekiro, neither game directly inspired the mechanics of the other. FromSoftware was able to develop both games simultaneously using a "co-director" structure, in which each of the developer's games had a staff member acting as director through its first stages of development. Miyazaki would then later provide direction on the game's mechanics, art, and music. The design team of Elden Ring concentrated on environmental scale, roleplaying, and storytelling as the main elements. Developers credited the scale as responsible for creating a sense of diversity, and intended for the roleplaying elements to allow for a variety of player interactions with the environment. Increasing the scale of the game required the creation of a several explorable structures, which the team conjoined in the open world. Miyazaki mentioned Shadow of the Colossus, The Elder Scrolls, The Witcher 3, and The Legend of Zelda: Breath of the Wild  as design influences for Elden Ring. He also credited RuneQuest, The Lord of the Rings, and Michael Moorcock's novel The Eternal Champion as inspirations for the game's story. Elden Ring original soundtrack was composed by Tsukasa Saitoh, Shoi Miyazawa, Tai Tomisawa, Yuka Kitamura, and Yoshimi Kudo.

Elden Ring was revealed during the Xbox games conference at E3 2019. Some information about the game had been previously leaked online due to a vulnerability of the servers at Bandai Namco Entertainment. The game was widely anticipated on announcement, but no further material was released until another trailer was shown in June 2021. Playtesting was facilitated by Bandai Namco, which released the game initially as a closed beta in November 2021 that players could sign up to test. The game was delayed to February 25, 2022, after its previous release date on January 21, 2022. Elden Ring had performance issues at launch, with complaints of deficient frame rate being common. Bandai Namco would address some of these issues through software patches and updates.

An expansion, Shadow of the Erdtree, was announced in February 2023 for release at a later date.

Reception 

Elden Ring received "universal acclaim" according to review aggregator website Metacritic. On Twitch, it drew nearly 900,000 viewers within 24 hours of release, making it the third-largest debut on the platform after Lost Ark and Cyberpunk 2077.

The game's open world setting received acclaim, with reviewers praising the exploration mechanics. Tamoor Hussain of GameSpot praised the Lands Between as the most expansive of FromSoftware's settings, calling exploration and discovery the main appeal of the game. Mitchell Saltzman of IGN lauded the game for rewarding exploration on every part of the map. Simon Parkin of The Guardian called the game's environments "intriguing and inventive." Some reviewers liked that the open landscape provided opportunities to discover and try multiple challenges. Exploration drew many favorable comparisons to The Legend of Zelda: Breath of the Wild. The environments of the game were also praised for their artistic designs, with reviewers positively rating their execution in an open setting, while also appreciating the designs of linear dungeons.

Similarly to FromSoftware's earlier  Dark Souls games, Elden Ring difficulty provoked much commentary, with reviewers both praising and criticizing its lack of easier modes. Other reviewers considered Elden Ring the most accessible Souls game, saying that the player could choose to avoid difficult threats and return with more experience. The combat of Elden Ring was praised for offering options towards fighting enemies, while keeping the game challenging. Torrent and fast travel were well-received features, with reviewers citing them as large improvements towards making the game easier to explore. The placing of checkpoints was also praised as helpful towards making the game more approachable.

Some reviewers criticized a number of the menu and accessibility systems. Reviewers also complained about the poor performance of the game on PC, with frame rate issues being commonly mentioned. Just after launch, the Steam version temporarily received primarily mixed reviews due to performance issues. A crowdfunding campaign for a board game based the game by Steamforged Games was launched on Kickstarter in November 2022.

The story of Elden Ring was noted by reviewers for lacking Martin's writing style. Kyle Orland of Ars Technica said that Elden Ring storytelling was "characteristically sparse and cryptic,” and unlike what fans of Martin would expect. Chris Carter of Destructoid called the story "low key", but said it was better told than in previous FromSoftware games. Aoife Wilson of Eurogamer said that George R. R. Martin's heavy inclusion in the marketing was "baffling" when his contributions to the overall narrative were unclear. Mitchell Saltzman did not mind the lack of Martin's style, saying the side stories, rather than any grand overarching plot, kept him "enthralled".

Sales 
It was the best-selling game in several regions between February and March 2022, and is the fastest-selling Bandai Namco game of all time. It was the second-best selling game of 2022 in the US after Call of Duty: Modern Warfare II and the tenth best-selling in Europe and Japan.

Awards 
Elden Ring won many awards and accolades. It was listed as the 2022's Game of the Year by several publications, including Ars Technica, Destructoid, Forbes, EGM, Eurogamer, Game Informer, GamesRadar+, GameSpot, IGN, PC Gamer, and Polygon.

References

Notes

External links
 
 
 

2022 video games
AIAS Game of the Year winners
Action role-playing video games
Bandai Namco games
D.I.C.E. Award for Role-Playing Game of the Year winners
Dark fantasy role-playing video games
FromSoftware games
Golden Joystick Award for Game of the Year winners
Japan Game Awards' Game of the Year winners
Multiplayer and single-player video games
Open-world video games
PlayStation 4 Pro enhanced games
PlayStation 4 games
PlayStation 5 games
Soulslike video games
The Game Award for Game of the Year winners
The Game Awards winners
Video games developed in Japan
Video games directed by Hidetaka Miyazaki
Video games featuring protagonists of selectable gender
Video games with alternate endings
Video games with customizable avatars
Windows games
Works by George R. R. Martin
Xbox One X enhanced games
Xbox One games
Xbox Series X and Series S games